Baby V.O.X was a South Korean K-pop group formed in 1997, whose final and best-known line-up consisted of Kim E-Z, Lee Hee-jin, Kan Mi-youn, Shim Eun-jin, and Yoon Eun-hye. They are considered one of the most prominent "first generation" K-pop girl groups of the late 1990s and early 2000s along with S.E.S and Fin.K.L, and they are recognized as being one of the groups at the forefront of the Korean Wave, having broken into the Chinese market. The group released seven studio albums and disbanded in 2006.

History

Debut and early years (1997–1999)
Baby V.O.X debuted in 1997 as a five-member group consisting of Kim E-Z, Lee Hee-jin, Jung Hyun-jeon, Cha Yu-mi, and Jung Shi-woon. Their debut single was entitled Hair Cut and taken from the album Equalizeher, released on July 10, 1997. The group displayed a style inspired by Spice Girls, but their 1st album was not successful due to their edgy concept. Cha Yumi was injured during their performance, so she was then replaced by Kan Miyoun. Hyun-jeon and Shi-woon left the group due to internal conflict, so they were replaced by Shim Eun Jin, and Lee Gai. The group adopted a more modest and cutesy style, used by popular groups such as S.E.S. and Fin.K.L. From the album Baby V.O.X II, the single, "Ya Ya Ya" became a success, reaching number seven on the Korean pop charts. It was followed by a second single, "Change". Following the release, Lee Gai was forced out by DR Music, because she had been lying about her age. She had debuted with the trio Setorae over ten years previously under her birth name Lee Hee-jung.

Breakthrough years and mainstream success (1999–2003)
In June 1999, Yoon Eun Hye replaced Lee Gai and this lineup became permanent and was their final. Their single "Get Up" was released. For the first time, they reached the number one spot on the Korean music pop charts. Another single "Killer" also hit the first place on the music charts and earned the 'Top Excellency Award' in Seoul Music Award in 1999. The third single 'Missing You' was also included on the album Come Come Come Baby (1999).

In the years that followed, Baby VOX made a number of appearances in variety shows. After their success of the third album, they started promoting themselves internationally, including China, Japan and other Southeast Asian countries. The fourth album, Why, featured the two singles; "Why" and "배신 (Betrayal)", while they also featured as a show host in SBS variety program, Beautiful Sunday-Cruise to the Korea Strait. Their fifth album, Boyish Story was released in 2001 and included the singles "Game Over", "인형 (Doll)", "I Wish You are My Love".

As well as their success in Asian markets, Baby VOX released a special hits album were from their first five albums, with two single hits 우연 (Coincidence) and Go. With Coincidence, the group hit number one in the Korean music charts for the first time in three years. Coincidence was also released in a World Cup version, and performed all around Korea during the 2002 Korea/Japan World Cup season, and remained popular throughout the summer. In addition to that, they managed to have a Live Concert in Seoul, which was hugely popular. Baby VOX Music Award was also created in China.

The group held a concert in Mongolia in 2004, being the first Korean idol band to do so. The group also performed in Pyongyang, North Korea in 2003, and was the second girl-group to perform in North Korea.

Final albums and separation (2003–2006)

In spring of 2003, Baby VOX released their sixth album "Devotion". Baby VOX topped the Chinese music chart with the Chinese single I'm Still Loving You, 3rd place with 나 어떡해 (What Should I Do) and 4th place with the same single in Thailand as well. In addition, pre-orders in the album in several countries ar as follows: 200,000+ in China, 50,000+ in Taiwan, 30,000+ in Hong Kong and 120,000+ in Thailand, with a total of 400,000 pre-orders plus the album sales in South Korea alone (210,000+) with now a total of 610,000+ of album sales. However, this was also when the group's fortunes started to change. While 'What Should I Do' hit the number one spot in the Korean music chart, their second single, 바램 (The Wish) wasn't as popular.

The group's seventh and final album Ride West, released in April 2004, featured songs in English, Chinese, Japanese, and Korean, as well as appearances by well-known American hip hop artists, such as Tupac Shakur, Jennifer Lopez, & independent rapper Floss P, although Tupac's "appearance" was a freestyle rap that he recorded while in prison. The rights for the sample of Tupac's verse were not cleared, and this resulted in a court case pursued by the rapper's mother, Afeni Shakur. A music video for the album's feature song, "Xcstasy", was done in English and emulated of the hip-hop videos popular in the United States at the time. A member of Korean hip hop group DJ DOC, offended by their alleged misuse of Tupac Shakur's lyrics, denounced them in the media, but later apologized. The group were forced to abandon the release of the single. A second single, "Play Remix" featuring Jennifer Lopez, was promoted for a short while, but sales were lower than from its previous albums.

Shim Eun-jin officially left the group in October 2004. Stating that she "didn't like the direction where their company was going".

After May 2005, Baby VOX went into hiatus and Yoon Eun-hye departed the group in April 2005. In February 2006, Baby VOX was officially disbanded.

Members

Final members
Kim E-Z – leader, rapper (1997–2006)
Lee Hee-jin – lead vocal (1997–2006)
Shim Eun-jin – sub vocal (1998–2004)
Kan Mi-youn – main vocal (1997–2006)
Yoon Eun-hye – sub vocal (1999–2005)

Former members
Cha Yumi, subvocal (1997–1998)
Jung Hyun-jeon, lead vocal (1997–1998)
Jung Shi-woon, rapper, leader (1997–1998)
Lee Gai, subvocal (1998–1999)

Discography

Studio albums

Compilation albums

Extended plays

Awards

Endorsements 

2004: Korean Airlines

Future generations 

On December 26, 2006, DR Music unveiled the members of the 2nd generation Baby V.O.X, a spinoff group called "Baby V.O.X. Re.V" (pronounced "reeve").  Like the original group, there is one lead vocalist, three "sub-vocalists", and a singer/rapper.

RaNia debuted in April 2011. It was originally scheduled to debut in mid-2010. However, their company, DR Music decided to rebrand them as a new group with eight members. RaNia is the 3rd generation of Baby V.O.X.

References

South Korean girl groups
South Korean dance music groups
Musical groups established in 1997
Musical groups disestablished in 2006
K-pop music groups
1997 establishments in South Korea
2006 disestablishments in South Korea
Musical quintets